Roman Makarov (born 19 August 1984) is a visually impaired Russian Paralympic swimmer who specializes in the butterfly stroke. He represents Russia in elite international events.

Career
Makarov represented Russia at the 2012 Summer Paralympics in the men's 100 metre butterfly S12 event and won a gold medal.

Makarov represented Russian Paralympic Committee athletes at the 2020 Summer Paralympics in the men's 100 metre butterfly S12 event and won a bronze medal.

References

1984 births
Living people
People from Mogilev
Paralympic swimmers of Russia
Medalists at the World Para Swimming European Championships
Medalists at the World Para Swimming Championships
Swimmers at the 2012 Summer Paralympics
Swimmers at the 2020 Summer Paralympics
Medalists at the 2012 Summer Paralympics
Medalists at the 2020 Summer Paralympics
Paralympic medalists in swimming
Paralympic gold medalists for Russia
Paralympic bronze medalists for the Russian Paralympic Committee athletes
Russian male backstroke swimmers
Russian male butterfly swimmers
S12-classified Paralympic swimmers
20th-century Russian people
21st-century Russian people